Adrian Paul Heath (born 11 January 1961) is an English football manager and former player. He currently serves as head coach of Major League Soccer club Minnesota United FC. As a player, he is best known for his six seasons at Everton, where he won two First Division titles and an FA Cup. As a manager, Heath initially worked in his native England before moving abroad to Orlando City, an expansion side in the American second division. Orlando City had the best start of any newly founded team in the history of American soccer, winning multiple honours before joining MLS in 2015.

Playing career
Born in Newcastle-under-Lyme, Staffordshire, Heath started his playing career at Stoke City having joined the club from playing in the local Lads and dads League. He signed a professional contract at 17 and played in the reserves under the guidance of player coach Howard Kendall, Heath's impressive performances helped the second string to 2nd in the Central League and saw him win the club's young player of the year award. Known as "Inchy" due to his small stature, he burst on to the first team scene in 1979–80 displaying great maturity in the First Division and scoring two vital goals at the end of the season which ensured Stoke's survival. He scored seven goals in 41 matches in 1980–81 and five in 20 in 1981–82. With Heath fast becoming one of the most sought after midfielders in the country Richie Barker allowed him to join Everton in January 1982 for a then club record fee of £750,000.

He became Everton's top scorer in his second full season, scoring 18 in all competitions in the 1983–84 season.  His goal against Third Division Oxford United in the League Cup quarter final is widely credited with changing Everton's fortunes in the 1983–84 season, in which they went on to reach the League Cup final (losing to Liverpool in the replay) and lift the FA Cup, their first silverware since 1970. Grabbing a poor Kevin Brock back-pass, Heath scored a goal away at Oxford to equalize the match and earn Everton a chance to turn things around.

Heath was a key member of the successful Everton side of the mid-1980s, winning two league titles in 1985 and 1987 and the FA Cup in 1984. However his participation in the 1984-1985 title-winning season was cut short in December after a challenge from Sheffield Wednesday’s Brian Marwood resulted in a cruciate ligament injury which kept him out for the rest of the season. It is thought that Heath was in line for a call-up to Bobby Robson's England squad at the time. The injury prevented Heath from playing in the final of the European Cup Winner's Cup in which Everton beat Rapid Vienna 3-1. In 2018, the Everton Heritage Society arranged for Heath to receive a replica of the Cup Winner's Cup medal which was presented to him at Goodison Park in November 2018 during halftime of a Premier League fixture against Cardiff City. 

in 1988-89 Heath had a spell in Spain with Espanyol. After a single season he returned to England, where he spent the remainder of his career. In 1990 Manchester City manager Howard Kendall signed Heath from Aston Villa. Heath was one of a number of former Everton players signed by Kendall, and the transfer marked the third different club at which Heath had played under Kendall. His debut came as a substitute against Charlton Athletic in January 1990. During the 1990–91 season Heath forged a strike partnership with Niall Quinn, the short and agile Heath contrasting with Quinn's aerial ability. The pair started 33 matches together, though Heath scored only one goal, in the second match of the season. Heath then had a barren run that lasted 46 matches and came to an end in November 1991, when Heath scored two goals in a League Cup tie at Queen's Park Rangers. As the 1991–92 season progressed, Heath lost his place in the team to young striker Mike Sheron.

In March 1992 Heath briefly returned to his first club Stoke City, until the end of the 1991–92 season. In that brief spell back at the Victoria Ground Heath played in six league matches a play-off match against Stockport County and also played in the 1992 Football League Trophy Final which saw Stoke beat Stockport 1–0. Heath also had a notable three-year stint at Burnley from 1992–95, where he helped them lift the 1994 Second Division play-Off trophy. Following a brief period at Sheffield United, he returned to Burnley as player-manager before retiring at the end of the 1996–97 season which served him accolades.

Managerial career

England
Heath began his managerial career as player-manager of Burnley in March 1996. He left after the 1996–97 season having finished ninth in the Second Division. He  worked with former Everton teammate Peter Reid at Sunderland, managing Sunderland Reserves to a Pontins League championship in 1999. That summer, he was appointed manager of Sheffield United but he left the club after only five months. He later followed Reid to Leeds United and Coventry City. When Reid left Coventry in January 2005, Heath stepped in as caretaker. He remained at the club under Reid's successor Micky Adams and again acted as caretaker in January 2007 before leaving the club after Iain Dowie was appointed.

United States
Heath was appointed manager of USL-1 expansion team Austin Aztex in February 2008 after a meeting with owner Phil Rawlins in a pub in Newcastle Under Lyme. In 2010, the team relocated to Florida to become Orlando City, playing in the USL PRO division. In Orlando, Heath led the team to two regular season titles and the league championship in their first two years. Heath was named USL coach of the year both years.

After their successes in the USL, Orlando City SC was granted an expansion franchise in MLS for the 2015 season with Heath at the helm. On 21 November 2014, Heath signed a contract extension committing him to Orlando City through to the end of the 2017 MLS season. Heath was sacked by Orlando City on 7 July 2016 following a 4–0 defeat against FC Dallas.

In November 2016, Heath was hired as head coach for Minnesota United prior to their first season in MLS after a tenure in the North American Soccer League. The team struggled in its early games, partially due to several of their players being called for international duty. Through the first four games Minnesota United conceded 18 goals, more than any other MLS team had allowed in the first six games of a season. Heath got his first win as United's manager with a 4–2 home victory over Real Salt Lake.

Career statistics

As a player
Source:

A.  The "Other" column constitutes appearances and goals in the FA Charity Shield, Football League Trophy, Football League play-offs, Full Members Cup, Mercantile Credit Centenary Trophy, Screen Sport Super Cup, UEFA Cup Winners' Cup.

As a manager

Personal life
Adrian Heath's son, Harrison, is also a footballer.

Honours

Player
Everton
Football League First Division: 1984–85, 1986–87
FA Cup: 1983–84
FA Charity Shield: 1984, 1985, 1986, 1987
UEFA Cup Winners' Cup: 1984–85
Football League Cup runner-up: 1983–84

Stoke City
Football League Trophy: 1991–92

Burnley
Football League Second Division play-offs: 1994

Manager
Orlando City
 USL Pro League: 2011, 2013
 USL Pro Commissioner's Cup: 2011, 2012, 2014

Individual
USL Pro Coach of the Year: 2011, 2012

References

External links
 
 

1961 births
Sportspeople from Newcastle-under-Lyme
Living people
English footballers
England under-21 international footballers
England B international footballers
La Liga players
Stoke City F.C. players
Everton F.C. players
Aston Villa F.C. players
RCD Espanyol footballers
Manchester City F.C. players
Burnley F.C. players
Sheffield United F.C. players
English football managers
Burnley F.C. managers
Sheffield United F.C. managers
Coventry City F.C. managers
Newcastle United F.C. non-playing staff
USL First Division coaches
Sunderland A.F.C. non-playing staff
English Football League players
Orlando City SC coaches
Association football midfielders
Minnesota United FC coaches
FA Cup Final players